Tolyatti constituency (No.159) is a Russian legislative constituency in Samara Oblast. Until 2007 the constituency covered the whole city of Tolyatti but since 2016 it includes only parts of Toyatti and surrounding rural areas.

Members

Election results

1993

|-
! colspan=2 style="background-color:#E9E9E9;text-align:left;vertical-align:top;" |Candidate
! style="background-color:#E9E9E9;text-align:left;vertical-align:top;" |Party
! style="background-color:#E9E9E9;text-align:right;" |Votes
! style="background-color:#E9E9E9;text-align:right;" |%
|-
|style="background-color:#E9E26E"|
|align=left|Vyacheslav Smirnov
|align=left|Russian Democratic Reform Movement
|
|33.44%
|-
| colspan="5" style="background-color:#E9E9E9;"|
|- style="font-weight:bold"
| colspan="3" style="text-align:left;" | Total
| 
| 100%
|-
| colspan="5" style="background-color:#E9E9E9;"|
|- style="font-weight:bold"
| colspan="4" |Source:
|
|}

1995

|-
! colspan=2 style="background-color:#E9E9E9;text-align:left;vertical-align:top;" |Candidate
! style="background-color:#E9E9E9;text-align:left;vertical-align:top;" |Party
! style="background-color:#E9E9E9;text-align:right;" |Votes
! style="background-color:#E9E9E9;text-align:right;" |%
|-
|style="background-color:"|
|align=left|Anatoly Morozov
|align=left|Our Home – Russia
|
|23.22%
|-
|style="background-color:"|
|align=left|Mikhail Burlakov
|align=left|Liberal Democratic Party
|
|15.55%
|-
|style="background-color:#1A1A1A"|
|align=left|Yulia Danshina
|align=left|Stanislav Govorukhin Bloc
|
|11.68%
|-
|style="background-color:"|
|align=left|Nikolay Sudakov
|align=left|Agrarian Party
|
|10.41%
|-
|style="background-color:"|
|align=left|Andrey Polynsky
|align=left|Independent
|
|9.76%
|-
|style="background-color:"|
|align=left|Sergey Sedykin
|align=left|Independent
|
|5.05%
|-
|style="background-color:#959698"|
|align=left|Vladimir Poplavsky
|align=left|Derzhava
|
|4.56%
|-
|style="background-color:#1C1A0D"|
|align=left|Vadim Mingalev
|align=left|Forward, Russia!
|
|4.04%
|-
|style="background-color:#2C299A"|
|align=left|Vladimir Lomakin
|align=left|Congress of Russian Communities
|
|3.62%
|-
|style="background-color:"|
|align=left|Larisa Bozina
|align=left|Independent
|
|1.65%
|-
|style="background-color:#000000"|
|colspan=2 |against all
|
|8.61%
|-
| colspan="5" style="background-color:#E9E9E9;"|
|- style="font-weight:bold"
| colspan="3" style="text-align:left;" | Total
| 
| 100%
|-
| colspan="5" style="background-color:#E9E9E9;"|
|- style="font-weight:bold"
| colspan="4" |Source:
|
|}

1999

|-
! colspan=2 style="background-color:#E9E9E9;text-align:left;vertical-align:top;" |Candidate
! style="background-color:#E9E9E9;text-align:left;vertical-align:top;" |Party
! style="background-color:#E9E9E9;text-align:right;" |Votes
! style="background-color:#E9E9E9;text-align:right;" |%
|-
|style="background-color:"|
|align=left|Anatoly Ivanov
|align=left|Independent
|
|30.06%
|-
|style="background-color:"|
|align=left|Vitaly Zykov
|align=left|Independent
|
|12.42%
|-
|style="background-color:"|
|align=left|Vladimir Chungurov
|align=left|Communist Party
|
|11.32%
|-
|style="background-color:"|
|align=left|Vyacheslav Volkov
|align=left|Independent
|
|10.21%
|-
|style="background-color:"|
|align=left|Anatoly Morozov (incumbent)
|align=left|Independent
|
|8.90%
|-
|style="background-color:"|
|align=left|Dmitry Vasilyev
|align=left|Unity
|
|6.95%
|-
|style="background-color:#3B9EDF"|
|align=left|Aleksey Kirienko
|align=left|Fatherland – All Russia
|
|5.81%
|-
|style="background-color:"|
|align=left|Vladimir Yakushin
|align=left|Independent
|
|1.51%
|-
|style="background-color:#C21022"|
|align=left|Andrey Zherebyatyev
|align=left|Party of Pensioners
|
|1.39%
|-
|style="background-color:"|
|align=left|Vladimir Kozlyaev
|align=left|Liberal Democratic Party
|
|1.16%
|-
|style="background-color:"|
|align=left|Vyacheslav Kolesov
|align=left|Independent
|
|1.06%
|-
|style="background-color:"|
|align=left|Andrey Demidov
|align=left|Independent
|
|0.58%
|-
|style="background-color:#FCCA19"|
|align=left|Sergey Sankov
|align=left|Congress of Russian Communities-Yury Boldyrev Movement
|
|0.27%
|-
|style="background-color:#084284"|
|align=left|Pavel Safronov
|align=left|Spiritual Heritage
|
|0.16%
|-
|style="background-color:#000000"|
|colspan=2 |against all
|
|6.94%
|-
| colspan="5" style="background-color:#E9E9E9;"|
|- style="font-weight:bold"
| colspan="3" style="text-align:left;" | Total
| 
| 100%
|-
| colspan="5" style="background-color:#E9E9E9;"|
|- style="font-weight:bold"
| colspan="4" |Source:
|
|}

2003

|-
! colspan=2 style="background-color:#E9E9E9;text-align:left;vertical-align:top;" |Candidate
! style="background-color:#E9E9E9;text-align:left;vertical-align:top;" |Party
! style="background-color:#E9E9E9;text-align:right;" |Votes
! style="background-color:#E9E9E9;text-align:right;" |%
|-
|style="background-color:#FFD700"|
|align=left|Anatoly Ivanov (incumbent)
|align=left|People's Party
|
|29.31%
|-
|style="background-color:"|
|align=left|Aleksandr Taratynov
|align=left|United Russia
|
|20.88%
|-
|style="background-color:"|
|align=left|Svetlana Peunova
|align=left|Independent
|
|10.84%
|-
|style="background-color:#1042A5"|
|align=left|Borislav Grinblat
|align=left|Union of Right Forces
|
|9.52%
|-
|style="background-color:"|
|align=left|Vladimir Chungurov
|align=left|Independent
|
|6.46%
|-
|style="background-color:"|
|align=left|Lyudmila Balashova
|align=left|Liberal Democratic Party
|
|4.96%
|-
|style="background-color:"|
|align=left|Igor Safonov
|align=left|Independent
|
|1.94%
|-
|style="background-color:"|
|align=left|Boris Zhigalev
|align=left|Agrarian Party
|
|1.34%
|-
|style="background-color:#408080"|
|align=left|Vladimir Konovalov
|align=left|For a Holy Russia
|
|1.34%
|-
|style="background-color:#164C8C"|
|align=left|Roman Kolosov
|align=left|United Russian Party Rus'
|
|0.53%
|-
|style="background-color:#000000"|
|colspan=2 |against all
|
|11.93%
|-
| colspan="5" style="background-color:#E9E9E9;"|
|- style="font-weight:bold"
| colspan="3" style="text-align:left;" | Total
| 
| 100%
|-
| colspan="5" style="background-color:#E9E9E9;"|
|- style="font-weight:bold"
| colspan="4" |Source:
|
|}

2016

|-
! colspan=2 style="background-color:#E9E9E9;text-align:left;vertical-align:top;" |Candidate
! style="background-color:#E9E9E9;text-align:left;vertical-align:top;" |Party
! style="background-color:#E9E9E9;text-align:right;" |Votes
! style="background-color:#E9E9E9;text-align:right;" |%
|-
|style="background-color:"|
|align=left|Vladimir Bokk
|align=left|United Russia
|
|34.70%
|-
|style="background-color:"|
|align=left|Leonid Kalashnikov
|align=left|Communist Party
|
|31.09%
|-
|style="background-color:"|
|align=left|Sergey Mikhaylov
|align=left|Liberal Democratic Party
|
|9.81%
|-
|style="background:"| 
|align=left|Mikhail Maryakhin
|align=left|A Just Russia
|
|6.81%
|-
|style="background:"| 
|align=left|Anatoly Ivanov
|align=left|Communists of Russia
|
|4.00%
|-
|style="background:"| 
|align=left|Sergey Simak
|align=left|Yabloko
|
|2.12%
|-
|style="background-color:"|
|align=left|Andrey Gavrilov
|align=left|Rodina
|
|2.10%
|-
|style="background-color:" |
|align=left|Natalya Semikova
|align=left|The Greens
|
|2.10%
|-
|style="background:"| 
|align=left|Mikhail Kurbakov
|align=left|Party of Growth
|
|1.68%
|-
|style="background:"| 
|align=left|Vitaly Yerkaev
|align=left|People's Freedom Party
|
|1.35%
|-
| colspan="5" style="background-color:#E9E9E9;"|
|- style="font-weight:bold"
| colspan="3" style="text-align:left;" | Total
| 
| 100%
|-
| colspan="5" style="background-color:#E9E9E9;"|
|- style="font-weight:bold"
| colspan="4" |Source:
|
|}

2021

|-
! colspan=2 style="background-color:#E9E9E9;text-align:left;vertical-align:top;" |Candidate
! style="background-color:#E9E9E9;text-align:left;vertical-align:top;" |Party
! style="background-color:#E9E9E9;text-align:right;" |Votes
! style="background-color:#E9E9E9;text-align:right;" |%
|-
|style="background-color: " |
|align=left|Leonid Kalashnikov
|align=left|Communist Party
|77,988
|38.71%
|-
|style="background-color: " |
|align=left|Irina Dolgopolova
|align=left|United Russia
|43,644
|21.66%
|-
|style="background-color: " |
|align=left|Ivan Popov
|align=left|A Just Russia — For Truth
|18,924
|9.39%
|-
|style="background-color: " |
|align=left|Andrey Urusov
|align=left|New People
|9,565
|4.75%
|-
|style="background-color:"|
|align=left|Boris Ardalin
|align=left|Party of Pensioners
|8,066
|4.00%
|-
|style="background-color: " |
|align=left|Aleksandr Kotlyar
|align=left|Liberal Democratic Party
|7,322
|3.63%
|-
|style="background-color:"|
|align=left|Vadim Nuzhdin
|align=left|Rodina
|6,327
|3.14%
|-
|style="background:"| 
|align=left|Valery Lebedev
|align=left|Communists of Russia
|6,133
|3.04%
|-
|style="background-color: " |
|align=left|Nikolay Stepanov
|align=left|Russian Party of Freedom and Justice
|4,918
|2.44%
|-
|style="background-color:" |
|align=left|Yevgeny Zverev
|align=left|The Greens
|4,243
|2.11%
|-
|style="background:"| 
|align=left|Oleg Burlak
|align=left|Party of Growth
|4,201
|2.09%
|-
| colspan="5" style="background-color:#E9E9E9;"|
|- style="font-weight:bold"
| colspan="3" style="text-align:left;" | Total
| 198,275
| 100%
|-
| colspan="5" style="background-color:#E9E9E9;"|
|- style="font-weight:bold"
| colspan="4" |Source:
|
|}

Notes

References 

Politics of Samara Oblast
Russian legislative constituencies